Twentysomething is an Australian television comedy programme which premiered on 6 September 2011 on ABC2. The six-part comedy series was created by and starred Jess Harris and Josh Schmidt. It was based on a 2007 six-part RMITV supported series sitcom of the same name broadcast on Channel 31. Twentysomething returned for a second series on 27 June 2013.

A soundtrack was released on 21 October 2011.

Series overview

Plot
Jess and Josh are best friends, housemates and 'twentysomething'. While their friends finish university degrees, climb the corporate ladder and settle down, Jess and Josh live for the weekend. When they find themselves unemployed, they decide it is time to become their own bosses.

Their entrepreneurial pursuits range from a hugely successful erotic house cleaning service, guided Melbourne tours that show twentysomething backpackers the city in a new light, an elite babysitters' agency for a very small 60% commission and even profiting from returning lost dogs for big rewards. Although Jess and Josh have every intention of succeeding, they somehow manage to self-destruct, always ending in chaos.

With Josh under added pressure from his older and more successful brother Nick, (Simon Russell), to join the family advertising business, Jess finds a welcome distraction in Billy (Hamish Blake), an on again/off again ex who has recently returned home from an overseas adventure. When there is no one else, there is always Abby, (Leah de Niese), the back up friend.

Cast
 Jess Harris as Jess
 Josh Schmidt as Josh
 Hamish Blake as Billy
 Simon Russell as Nick
 Leah de Niese as Abby

See also
Love Is a Four Letter Word, a drama series from 2001 set in Newtown, in Sydney that deals with the concerns facing urban 20somethings in Australia.

References

External links 
 
 Official ABC site
 The creators discuss Twentysomething on the Boxcutters podcast

Australian Broadcasting Corporation original programming
Australian comedy television series
2011 Australian television series debuts
English-language television shows
RMITV productions